The 6620 is a smartphone created by Nokia, announced in 2005, running on Series 60 2nd Edition and the Symbian operating system. It was the first EDGE-capable phone for the Americas' market.

It is a version of Nokia's 6600 smartphone for the North American market, with all the features of the 6600 such as the VGA camera, MultiMediaCard slot, Bluetooth and color screen, but with a change to the North American GSM frequencies, newer version  of Nokia Series 60 v2 with Feature Pack 1 (the original 6600 had common Series 60 v2 without Feature Packs), the doubling of internal RAM, the addition of Nokia's new Pop-Port connector, the inclusion of stereo sound, and a new EDGE capability, effectively giving it double the download speeds of contemporary General Packet Radio Service (GPRS)-equipped phones. Although not officially designed as a successor, it replaced the Nokia 3620 in the Cingular Wireless (now AT&T Mobility) lineup shortly after their acquisition of AT&T Wireless Services.

This phone usually came packaged with a charger, battery, 32-megabyte MMC card and USB cable.

Features
 65,000 color screen
 VGA camera for pictures and video
 GSM voice communication (850 MHz, 1800 MHz and 1900 MHz)
 GPRS and EDGE data communication
 Bluetooth, infrared and USB connectivity
 Support for SMS, MMS and email messages
 Multiple mailboxes for remote email downloads
 Web browsing for WAP and HTTP websites
 12 megabytes internal memory
 MMC expansion slot supporting up to 2 gigabytes
 Hands-free speakerphone
 Multiple ringtones included with space for more
 Usual software including calendar, calculator, wallet, messaging, voice recorder, phone book, gallery, notes
 Symbian and Java support for applications and games
 Instant Messaging (IM) support
 RealPlayer included for audio and video playback
 Full MP3 support, including saved playlists
 Stereo audio playback using Nokia stereo headphones or Nokia AD-15 3.5mm stereo headphone adapter (the 6600 is mono-only)

Digital downloads
The EDGE capability allows the 6620 to play streaming video, so that users may view video clips that are not stored on the phone itself. The phone also supports downloading smart messages from the network, if supported by the network operator, to update settings.

Technical specifications
The main CPU in this phone is an ARM925t-compatible chip running at 150 MHz while the 6600 only runs at 104 MHz. The camera supports resolutions up to 640x480 and has a 2x digital zoom. It can record video for up to 10 minutes. The RealPlayer software can play back video and audio, and also files in MP3 and AVI format. The talk time is listed at 4 hours, with 200 hours of standby.

See also
 Nokia 6600
 Nokia 6670

References

External links
 Device Details Forum Nokia
 Using the Nokia 6620 as a Bluetooth modem

Nokia smartphones
Symbian devices
Mobile phones with infrared transmitter